Haikoucaris is a genus of megacheiran arthropod that contains the single species Haikoucaris ercaiensis. It was discovered in the Cambrian Chengjiang biota of China.

Morphology 
Haikoucaris measured about 38 mm in body length. The elongated body compose of a semicircular head shield, 13 trunk tergites and presumely a short, spine-like telson. The head possess a pair of unstalked eyes, a pair well-developed great appendages, as well as 3 more appendage pairs of unknown detail. Each of the great appendage consists of a 2-segmented peduncle and a 3-segmented claw. Each of the trunk segment possess a pair of biramus appendages that each comprising a leaf-shaped exopod and a possibly 7-segmented endopod.

Paleoecology 
Haikoucaris may have been a predator, with its great appendages and exopod suggested to be used for hunting and swimming respectively.

Taxonomy 
Within megacheirans, Haikoucaris is generally accepted to be a member of the clade Cheiromorpha alongside Yohoia and Leanchoiliidae.

See also

 Cambrian explosion
 Chengjiang biota
 List of Chengjiang Biota species by phylum

References

Megacheira
Cambrian arthropods
Maotianshan shales fossils
Prehistoric arthropod genera